Sir John Roper Wright, 1st Baronet (12 March 1843 – 25 July 1926) was a British steel manufacturer.

Wright was born in Croston, near Chorley, Lancashire. He became a pupil at the Soho Engineering Works in Preston and then worked for Sir William Siemens. He established his own company, Wright, Butler & Co, at Gowerton, near Swansea, and founded a number of steel works. His company was later absorbed by Baldwins Ltd, of which he became a director. He became chairman in 1908, succeeding Alfred Baldwin, father of Stanley Baldwin, the future prime minister.

Wright was a prominent Liberal Unionist and unsuccessfully stood for Parliament in 1895 and 1910. He was created a Baronet in the 1920 New Year Honours.

Wright died in Bath, Somerset, in 1926. He was succeeded in the baronetcy by his son, William Charles, upon whose death in 1950 the title became extinct.

Footnotes

References
Obituary, The Times, 27 July 1926

1843 births
1926 deaths
People from Croston
Baronets in the Baronetage of the United Kingdom
English businesspeople
Deputy Lieutenants of Glamorgan
Liberal Unionist Party parliamentary candidates